#1 is the first album by Hungarian singer Linda Király. Though it includes songs both in English and Hungarian, it was released only in Hungary, where it reached #19 on the official albums chart. It includes two of her previous hits, "Szerelem utolsó vérig" (the theme song of the movie of the same title) and "Clubsong" (feat. Pain), the theme song of a reality show.

Track listing

Singles with positions and track listings
Szerelem utolsó vérig
(music video only)
Clubsong
(#2 on MAHASZ Single Top 10, #7 on Top 40 Airplay)
 Clubsong 3:46
 Clubsong (4U remix) 4:07
 Clubsong (instrumental version) 3:46

Holla
(music video & digital download only)
És mégis
(#25 on Top 40 Airplay)
 És mégis
 És mégis (Sun radio mix)
 És mégis (Shane 54 unleashed remix)
 És mégis (Shane 54 radio edit)

Sources

Linda Király albums
2003 albums